The Good Cop is an American streaming television comedy-drama murder-mystery created by Andy Breckman. The ten-episode series premiered on Netflix on September 21, 2018. On November 13, 2018, Netflix canceled the series after one season.

It is based on an Israeli show of the same name created by Erez and Tomer Aviram and produced by Yoav Gross.

Cast

Main
 Tony Danza as Anthony "Tony" Caruso Sr., a streetwise ex-cop paroled from prison after serving seven years for a corruption conviction. He is tough and stubborn and knows the ins and outs of the criminal underworld. Although prohibited from interacting professionally with active police personnel, he is intent on proving that he still has what it takes to fight crime and solve homicide cases. 
 Josh Groban as Anthony "TJ" Caruso Jr., Tony Sr.'s son, a by-the-book NYPD lieutenant who, in contrast to his father, goes to great lengths to avoid departmental infractions, even minor ones.
 Monica Barbaro as Cora Vasquez, an inspector turned homicide detective in the NYPD and Tony Sr.'s parole officer. She is a subordinate of Tony Jr.
 Isiah Whitlock Jr. as Burl Loomis, a veteran NYPD sergeant on the verge of retirement who coasts his way through investigations, making as little effort as possible. He refuses to chase suspects on foot or get out of his car during cold weather.
 Bill Kottkamp as Ryan Domki, a technical crime analyst for the NYPD. He is ultra-nerdy, technologically savvy, and obsessed with electronic devices.

Recurring
 John Scurti as Wendell Kirk, a barber and Tony Sr.'s friend

Guest
 Frank Whaley as Joseph Privett
 John Carroll Lynch as Sherman Smalls (Episode 3, "Who Is the Ugly German Lady?")
 Bob Saget as Richie Knight (Episode 6, "Did the TV Star Do It?")
 Rebecca Rittenhouse as Macy Clarke (Episode 7, "Who Killed the Guy on the Ski Lift?")

Production
Netflix announced the new series in June 2017. The show stars Tony Danza as "a disgraced, former NYPD officer who never followed the rules", and Josh Groban as his son, Tony Jr., "an earnest, obsessively honest NYPD detective who makes a point of always following the rules".
The show was created and is written by Andy Breckman, who created and wrote the Emmy Award-winning USA Network series Monk.

The main characters are father and son policemen, Tony Caruso Sr. and Jr., who live together. Tony Sr. (Danza) was expelled from law enforcement and arrested for chronic violations of departmental policy, while his son, Tony Jr. (Groban) scrupulously obeys departmental procedures. During one scene in episode 1, two of Tony Jr.'s colleagues reveal that others in the department refer to him sarcastically as the "Choirboy" and "Nancy Drew." In the series, according to Netflix, "This 'odd couple' become unofficial partners as Tony Sr. offers his overly-cautious son blunt, street-wise advice on everything from handling suspects to handling women."

Danza, a native New Yorker, anticipated drawing "on his real-life connection to the NYPD", as a member of the board of directors of the city's Police Athletic League, to develop his character. The first season was filmed in various neighborhoods in Brooklyn.

About the series, Breckman said, "Many cop shows feature dark and provocative material: psycho-sexual killers, twisted, grim, flawed detectives. Many address the most controversial issues of the day. I watch a lot of them. God bless 'em all. But the show I want to produce is playful, family-friendly, and a celebration of old-fashioned puzzle-solving."

Music for the series was composed by Pat Irwin.

Episodes

Season 1 (2018)

Cancellation
On November 13, 2018, the series was canceled after one season.

References

External links 
The Good Cop at Netflix

2010s American comedy-drama television series
2010s American crime drama television series
2010s American police comedy television series
2018 American television series debuts
2018 American television series endings
American crime comedy television series
American detective television series
American television series based on Israeli television series
English-language Netflix original programming
Fictional portrayals of the New York City Police Department
Television series by 3 Arts Entertainment
Television series created by Andy Breckman
Television shows filmed in New York City
Television shows set in New York City